The following is a list of massacres that have occurred in Lithuania (numbers may be approximate):

References

Lithuania
Massacres

Massacres